Peter Malcolm is an Australian former professional rugby league footballer, who played in the 1980s.

Playing career
Malcolm made his first grade debut for Newcastle in Round 2 1988 during the club's inaugural season.  Malcolm played from the bench as the club recorded their first ever victory defeating Western Suburbs 20–16.  Malcolm made his final appearance in first grade against Balmain in Round 18 1988 which ended in an 18–16 loss.

References

Year of birth missing (living people)
Place of birth missing (living people)
Australian rugby league players
Newcastle Knights players
Living people
Rugby league hookers